Rear Admiral Justin Jayasuriya is a former Chief of staff of Sri Lanka Navy and Commander of Eastern Naval Command of Sri Lanka Navy. Under his command, Sri Lanka Navy Hydrographic Branch was established on 19th January 1970 while he was serving as Lieutenant.

Early life
Justin Jayasuriya was educated at Nalanda College, Colombo.

Rear Admiral Jayasuriya had served as one time Board of Directors member for Duncan White Foundation.

General references 

 Old Nalandian sc's agm
 Office Bearers - 2011/2012 Old Nalandians’ Sports Club

Sri Lankan Buddhists
Alumni of Nalanda College, Colombo
Sri Lankan rear admirals
Sinhalese military personnel
Naval and Maritime Academy graduates
Living people
Year of birth missing (living people)